or  is an island in Skjervøy Municipality in Troms og Finnmark county, Norway. The  island lies between the Kvænangen fjord (to the east) and the Lyngen fjord to the west. The island is home to 27 inhabitants (2001). Kågen is the 52nd largest island in Norway.

There is a ferry connection with the neighboring islands of Arnøya and Laukøya to the north, the Skjervøy Bridge connects to the island Skjervøya to the east, and the undersea Maursund Tunnel connects the island to the mainland to the south.

See also
 List of islands of Norway by area
 List of islands of Norway

References

Skjervøy
Islands of Troms og Finnmark